Jean-Alfred Gautier or Alfred Gautier (18 July 1793 – 30 November 1881) was a Swiss astronomer.

Biography
He was born in Cologny. He was the son of François Gautier, merchant, and of Marie de Tournes.

He studied astronomy at the University of Geneva, then at the University of Paris. He was awarded a doctorate in celestial mechanics in Paris in 1817; his thesis was entitled Historical essay on the problem of three bodies. His academic advisors were Laplace, Lagrange and Legendre. In 1818 he worked in England with Herschel.

Back in Geneva in 1819, he was appointed astronomy professor then, in 1821, professor of advanced mathematics at the University of Geneva and director of the Observatory of Geneva. He had a new building constructed on the site in 1830 which was equipped with new instruments: an equatorial of Gambey and a meridian circle.

In 1839, visual impairments prevented him from continuing his career and he gave up his position to one of his pupils, Emile Plantamour.

In 1852, within a year of the publication of Schwabe's results, Gautier and three other researchers (Edward Sabine, Rudolf Wolf and Johann von Lamont) announced independently that the sunspot cycle period was absolutely identical to that of geomagnetic activity.

Gautier married Angélique Frossard de Saugy  in 1826, then in 1849 Louise Cartier. He died without children in Geneva.

References

19th-century Swiss astronomers
University of Paris alumni
Academic staff of the University of Geneva
1793 births
1881 deaths
Scientists from Geneva
Swiss expatriates in France